Robert Rolison is an American law enforcement official and politician currently serving in the New York State Senate.

Career

Law Enforcement
In 1982, Rolison joined the Town of Poughkeepsie's police department and served for 12 years in the patrol division. He later worked as a detective for the department for 14 years.

Politics
From 2003 to 2015, Rolison served on the Dutchess County Legislature as a representative, and was elected as chairman of the legislature in 2010 for the remainder of his time in the county government. He left to pursue Poughkeepsie mayorship and took office in 2016. He was reelected in 2019.

In 2022, Rolison announced a bid for State Senate District 39, and flipped the seat to red after a victory margin of 6,738 votes.

References

Politicians from Poughkeepsie, New York
Republican Party New York (state) state senators
21st-century American politicians
Year of birth missing (living people)
Living people